Simprulla is a genus of jumping spiders that was first described by Eugène Louis Simon in 1901.  it contains only two species, found only in Brazil, Argentina, and Panama: S. argentina and S. nigricolor.

References

Salticidae
Salticidae genera
Spiders of South America